Giovanni Maria Lancisi (26 October 1654 – 20 January 1720) was an Italian physician, epidemiologist and anatomist who made a correlation between the presence of mosquitoes and the prevalence of malaria. He was also known for his studies about cardiovascular diseases, an examination of the corpus callosum of the brain, and is remembered in the eponymous Lancisi's sign. He also studied rinderpest during an outbreak of the disease in Europe.

Biography 
Giovanni Maria Lancisi (Latin name: Johannes Maria Lancisius) was born in Rome. His mother died shortly after his birth and he was raised by his aunt in Orvieto. He was educated at the Collegio Romano and the University of Rome, where by the age of 18, he had qualified in medicine. He worked at hospital of Santo Spirito in Sassia and trained at the Picentine College, Lauro. In 1684 he went to Sapienza University and held the chair of anatomy for thirteen years. He served as physician to Popes Innocent XI, Clement XI and Innocent XII. Clement XI gave Lancisi, the anatomical plates of Bartolomeo Eustachius; made originally in 1562 and had been forgotten or lost in the Vatican Library. Lancisi edited and published them in 1714 as the Tabulae anatomicae. 

Lancisi studied epidemiology, describing the epidemics of malaria and influenza. He published De Noxiis Paludum Effluviis (On the Noxious Effluvia of Marshes) in 1717, in which he recognized that mosquito-infested swamps are the breeding ground for malaria and recommended drainage of these areas to prevent the disease. He also published extensively on cardiology, describing vegetations on heart valves, cardiac syphilis, aneurysms and the classification of heart disease. His landmark De Motu Cordis et Aneurysmatibus was published posthumously in 1728, edited by Pietro Assalti who also conducted the autopsy of Lancisi and identified his death as being caused by a duodenal infarction.

Early in the 18th century, Lancisi had protested the medieval approaches to containing rinderpest in cattle by stating that "it is better to kill all sick and suspect animals, instead of allowing the disease to spread in order to have enough time and the honour to discover a specific treatment that is often searched for without any success". Lancisi who made the first breakthrough in the control of rinderpest (Lancisi, 1715), a procedure that was  later adopted by Thomas Bates.

However, Lancisi also erred, as he disputed the work of Giovanni Cosimo Bonomo (1663-1696), his contemporary, who had correctly identified the cause of scabies as a parasite. Lancisi however felt scabies was of humoral origin. Because of Lancisi’s powerful position and, because previous scientists like Galileo Galilei had fallen into disgrace, Bonomo was silenced and his discovery was forgotten until the modern era.

Studies on the brain and the soul
Lancisi described the corpus callosum as the "seat of the soul, which imagines, deliberates and judges." His Dissertatio Physiognomica provided the supporting argument in 1713. He opposed alternative locations of the soul as hypothesized by others, such as the centrum ovale, by Andreas Vesalius, and the pineal gland, by René Descartes. He hypothesized that the longitudinal striae (later named in his honor as the "striae lancisi" or "nerves of Lancisi") were the conduit between the anterior location of the soul, and the posterior location of sensory organ functions, both within the corpus callosum.

Notes

References

External links 

 
  Dissertatio historica de bovilla peste, ex Campaniae finibus anno 1713, Rome, 1715.
Dissertatio historica de bovilla peste (1715)

1654 births
1720 deaths
18th-century Latin-language writers
18th-century Italian male writers
Italian public health doctors
Italian anatomists
17th-century Italian physicians
18th-century Italian physicians
Malariologists
Fellows of the Royal Society